Dave Allen is a former professional rugby league footballer who played in the 1980s.

References

External links
Statistics at rugby.widnes.tv
Statistics at wolvesplayers.thisiswarrington.co.uk

Living people
London Broncos players
Place of birth missing (living people)
Rugby league centres
Rugby league fullbacks
Rugby league locks
Rugby league second-rows
Warrington Wolves players
Widnes Vikings players
Year of birth missing (living people)